Dudley Park railway station is located on the Gawler line.

History

The station opened in 1915.

To the west of the station lies the Australian Rail Track Corporation standard gauge line to Crystal Brook.

Services by platform

References

External links

Railway stations in Adelaide
Railway stations in Australia opened in 1915